Now Look Here is a BBC situation comedy which ran for two series of seven episodes each during 1971 to 1973. It was written by Barry Cryer and Graham Chapman.

It starred Ronnie Corbett, who played a character of the same name.  He was cast in a similar role to his character in the later, longer-running and better-known situation comedy, Sorry!, as an overgrown mother's boy who was trying to break away from his mother (played by Madge Ryan) but having some difficulty doing so. However, it differs from the later series in that he does leave home after a few episodes, although his new home is only a few doors away, his father is deceased and he does not have any siblings. In the second series, he was married, his wife being played by Rosemary Leach.  His boss was played by Donald Hewlett.

All episodes still exist, although one of these survived in the American NTSC standard, from which it has been converted.

See also
 The Prince of Denmark – 1974 sequel with Corbett and Leach.

References

External links

BBC television sitcoms
1971 British television series debuts
1973 British television series endings
1970s British sitcoms